Tyshane Thompson (born 1995), professionally known as Beam (an acronym for Be Everything And More; stylised in all caps; formerly as Tyshane and Elite), is a Jamaican-American rapper, singer, songwriter, and record producer. He is the son of dancehall and gospel reggae singer Papa San. He was one-half of the production duo 808&Elite. Beam released his debut studio album, Alien, on 4 February 2022. It includes collaborations with Justin Bieber, Jorja Smith, and his father, among others.

Career
According to Thompson's father, he started producing at age ten. He formed the now-disbanded production duo 808&Elite with Matt Massaro.

He first received notice when he produced for Andy Mineo on the tracks "Young", featuring KB, and "Michael Jackson", featuring Thi'sl, Rich Perez, R-Swift, and Bubba Watson, from the mixtape Formerly Known in 2011. In 2012 he produced the highly popular, Jamaican-tinged song "Black Rose" by Lecrae on the mixtape Church Clothes. He also appeared in the final episode of the web-series Saturday Morning Car-Tunez, created by Andy Mineo, where he helped remix the Puff Daddy song "It's All About the Benjamins". On 6 July 2012, Thompson and Matt Massaro, under the name 808&Elite, released the single "Me Monster", featuring Andy Mineo, from their upcoming beat-tape, Diamonds x Pearls. The tape was made available two days later for free download exclusively through the Christian hip-hop website Rapzilla. Thompson's talent was praised by critics when he and ThaInnaCircle produced the bass-heavy, East Coast style, reggae and dancehall-influenced song "Violence" by Lecrae from the Grammy-winning album Gravity, released on 4 September 2012. In October 2012, Thompson competed at the second Annual Rapzilla.com Beat Battle at the 2012 Flavor Fest. Thompson, his father Papa San and brother Tyrone Andrew, are working on a collaborative project. 808 & Elite now produces under Street Symphony's Track or Die label. In addition to his work with his father and brother, Lecrae, and Andy Mineo, Tyshane has produced, both independently and as part of 808 & Elite, for artists such as 2 Chainz, Yo Gotti, G-Eazy, Xavier Omär, and Asaiah Ziv.

Discography

Studio albums

Extended plays

Singles

As lead artist

As featured artist

Other charted songs

Guest appearances

Production discography

2010
Tyrone Andrew – The Road
03. "Narrow Road" (featuring Jonathan Guerra)
04. "Take Him On"

2011
Andy Mineo – Formerly Known
05. "Young" (featuring KB)

Paul Morris – Paul Morris Under Construction – Co-produced with Paul Morris

2012
Papa San – My Story
Tyrone Andrew – "Encamp"
Lecrae – Church Clothes
09. "Black Rose"
Andy Mineo – Saturday Morning Cartoons
04. "Benjamins" (featuring Rich Perez and Izz) – remix of "It's All About the Benjamins" by Puff Daddy (featuring Lil' Kim, The LOX, and The Notorious B.I.G.)
Tyrone Andrew – "Love or Hate"

Lecrae – Gravity
07. "Violence" – (Co-produced with ThaInnaCircle)
DJ Official and Alex Medina – Gravity The Remix EP
13. "Tell the World" (featuring Mali Music)
KIDD – "Fireworks" (featuring Tyshane)

2013
Beleaf – Theo's Gift
06. "Bass Loud" (featuring Andy Mineo)

Gabe – "Yikes" (featuring Tyshane)

Andy Mineo – Heroes for Sale
09. "Wild Things" – (Co-produced with ThaInnaCircle & Joseph Prielozny)
10. "Take Me Alive"

SPZRKT – The Loner
14. "Spazzy Party (Turn Up)"

SPZRKT – "Best of Your Love"

Social Club – Summer of George
05. Majestic (featuring Thi'sl)

KIDD – "Murder My Flesh" – (Co-produced with ThaInnaCircle)

KIDD – Murder My Flesh
01. "Intro"

Papa San – One Blood
01. "Step Up" (featuring Da' T.R.U.T.H.)
02. "Your Eyes Are On Me" (featuring Fred Hammond) – Co-produced with Maurice Gregory
03. "Radio" (featuring Lecrae) – Co-produced with Maurice Gregory
04. "One Blood" (featuring Stitchie)
05. "Running" (featuring Tasan)
06. "Get Right" – Co-produced with Maurice Gregory
07. "Revival" (featuring Israel Houghton) – Co-produced with Maurice Gregory
08. "Show Me" (featuring Tiffany Hall) – Co-produced with Maurice Gregory
09. "I Love You" (featuring Tyrone Andrew) – Co-produced with ThaInnaCircle
11. "God By My Side" (featuring Ryan Mark)
13. "Don't Give Up the Fight" (featuring Jael Wiafe)

SPZRKT – Lucid Dream
01. "Back to You" – Co-produced with Jermaine

Lecrae – Church Clothes 2
04. "The Fever"

Man Praisin Hard – Critical Condition: The Mixtape, pt. 2
08. "Twerk Muzik"

2014
GABRL – "Starters" (featuring Tyshane)

J Mynor – "New Me"

KB – 100
06. "Crazy" – Co-produced with Cardec and Joseph Prielozny

The Rise – Casual Tuesdays
01. "Work"

D. Tropp – Away from Home
05. "Choices (The Break-Up)"
08. "Misbehave" (featuring SPZRKT) – Co-produced with Cardec Drums

Surf Gvng – Surf Gvng
06. "Sonic Boom" (featuring Marty)

Ernest Rush – STRT TRBL
03. "Another Taste"

2015 
Gabrl – Here's a Mixtape
02. "Untitled" (Co-produced with Gordonbeats, dsavagebeats, and pharaoh)
03. "Who" (co-produced with Alias and Dáramólá)

Yo Gotti – CM8
06. "No Mo" (co-produced with Street Symphony and D.O Speaks)

2016 
Adrian Stresow – Pajama Day
06. "Slippin'" (featuring Surf Gvng) (co-produced with D-Flow)

Stef Silva – "Highs" (co-produced with Alias)

Xavier Omar – "Hesitate"

Trav –  Push3
21. "We Living" (co-produced with Street Symphony)

2017 
Social Club Misfits – "Dive" (co-produced with Young Sidechain)

2018 
21 Savage –  I Am > I Was
10. "Ball w/o You" (co-produced with TM88)
11. "Good Day" (featuring ScHoolboy Q & Project Pat) (co-produced with 30 Roc & Cardo)

2019 
Andy Mineo – "Work In Progress"
03. "OT OD (sketch).mp3" (co-produced by Alex Medina)
18. "Honest 2 God Tyshance/DTSL 1.0.mp3" (co-produced by Daniel Steele)
20. "I ain't done (Beam Version).aif"

Skip Marley – "Enemy" (co-produced by Ryan Tedder)

2022 
Justin Bieber – "Honest" (featuring Don Toliver) (co-produced with Sonni and Azul Wynter)

808&Elite discography

EPs

Compilations

Singles

Production discography
Note that this includes tracks produced only by Matt Massaro aka 808

2011
Andy Mineo – Formerly Known
14. "Michael Jackson" (featuring Thi'sl, Rich Perez, R-Swift, and Bubba Watson)

2013
Andy Mineo – Heroes for Sale
08. "Shallow" (featuring Swoope) – Additional production from Joseph Prielozny and Andy Mineo

116 Clique – "Now They Know"

Lecrae – Church Clothes 2
01. "Co Sign pt. 2" – Co-produced with Street Symphony

SPZRKT – Lucid Dream
04. "Love & Pain (SPZRKT Remix)" – Co-produced with Sango Beats

2014
Bishop – Rose Gold
08. "Sinderella" – Produced by 808 and Mishene City

Thomas McLaren – "Us"

GABRL – "Better (Where I'm From)" (featuring SPZRKT)

GABRL – "Wake Up"

2 Chainz – Freebase
02. "Trap Back" – Co-produced with Street Symphony

Tracy T – The Wolf of All Streets
14. "Save Me" – Co-produced with Street Symphony

Tedashii – Below Paradise
13. "Complicated" (featuring Christon Gray) – Co-produced with Mashell and TOD

HillaryJane – Sticks and Stones
01. "Chimneys"
02. "Celebrity" (featuring Thi’sl)
03. "Wild Side"
04. "Shotgun"
05. "We Fight"
06. "Stix and Stones"

Wave Chapelle – Only the Beginning
05. "I Want It All" – Co-produced with Street Symphony

Lecrae – Anomaly
03. "Say I Won't" (featuring Andy Mineo) – Co-produced with Gawvi, with post-production by Andy Mineo

Paul Morris – Square One
01. "My Heart"
02. "Square One"
04. "Fallible Man" (featuring Rheama Blaze) – Co-produced with Paul Morris
07. "Luke Warm"
10. "Ready To Die"
11. "Soldiers of the Light"

Spencer Kane – Runway
03. "Runway"

Ernest Rush – STRT TRBL
08. "Say What [Remix]"

2015 
Thomas McLaren – "Us"

Yo Gotti – Concealed
03.  Super Power (co-produced with Street Symphony and D.O Speaks)

Neek Bucks – Here For a Reason Vol. II
"How Can I" (featuring Kevin Gates) (co-produced with Street Symphony)

Genra – "The Notebook" (co-produced with Alias)

Genra – "Black Holes" – produced by 8X8

KB – Tomorrow We Live
09. "Calling You" (featuring Natalie Lauren) – (co-produced with Dirty Rice and Joseph Prielozny)
13. "Crowns & Thorns (Oceans)" – (co-produced with Gawvi)

GABRL – Here's a Mixtape
05. "Bet You Wish
06. "Flaw City" (co-produced with 100 Labels)
07. "Anthum"
08. "Rocafella" (featuring Tasan and Daramola)
09. "Lies (Bonus)"

Reconcile – Catching Bodies
04. "Temptation" (featuring John Givez, Alex Faith, and Tasha Catour) – produced by 8X8 and D.O Speaks

2 Chainz – Trapavelli Tre
09. "Halo (Letter from My Unborn Son)" (co-produced with Street Symphony)

2016 
Reconcile – "Cross on Me" (co-produced with Alias)

2 Chainz – Felt Like Cappin
05.  Mindin my Business (produced by 8x8, D.O. Speaks & Street Symphony)

SPZRT – "Hesitate" (featuring Masaxgo) (co-produced with Alias)

David Banner – "Black Fist" (featuring Tito Lopez) (co-produced with Street Symphony and D.O Speaks)

Trav –  Push3
02. "It's a Will It's a Way" (co-produced with Street Symphony)

G Easy – "So Much Better" (featuring Playne James) (co-produced with Street Symphony)

Gabrl – "Too Much Left"

Zoey Dollaz – October
06. "U Can Be That" (featuring Ink) (produced by Street Symphony, 8x8, and D.O. Speaks)

2 Chainz – "Let's Ride" (featuring Ty Dolla Sign) – (produced by 8X8, Street Symphony, and D.O Speaks)

Filmography

As composer

As actor

Awards
Won Best Gospel Album at the 55th Annual Grammy Awards for Gravity in 2013

Notes

References

American hip hop record producers
Date of birth missing (living people)
Living people
1995 births